Shine Begho Usanga (born 15 September 1985) is a Nigerian radio personality, television host, producer, promoter, brand ambassador and a businesswoman.

Begho hosts events including The Twists With Shine and Shine with The Stars, as well as being the former breakfast show co-host on 96.9 Cool FM Lagos for 5 years.

Begho is the former radio host of The Sunday Chilloutzone Show, The Twist With Shine Radio Show, a weekend radio show on COOL-FM Lagos.  In 2017, Shine moved to 102.3 Max FM Lagos hosting the evening drive time show and in 2019 became the host of the midday show 'The Maxhits'.

Life and work

Early life and education
Begho was born in Delta State, Nigeria, and did her elementary education in Sapele Delta State High School in Benin City, Edo State and College in Anambra State.[5] She is the daughter of late Chief Justice Begho, a Chief justice of then Bendel State, and Ester Begho, a businesswoman.

Begho studied Mass communication (journalism) at Madonna University, Okija 2002. While in college, she was a dancer and model. Begho graduated in 2007 and moved back home to Lagos permanently to pursue her broadcasting career.[8]

Professional background

Television hosting
In 2007, Begho got a job as a television presenter with Galaxy Television. She also hosted a kids' TV show, and was featured on various television programmes and reality shows.

Radio hosting
In January 2008, Begho became a co-host of the Eko FM radio program Thank God It's Friday. The show aired every Friday afternoon; Shine Begho would finish her TV and rush to the radio station to join the other hosts. In April 2008, she went for her national youth service corp and was a major radio presenter in camp. In 2009, Begho became one of the new radio presenters With HOT FM Abuja, co-hosting the evening drive time show.

In December 2009, Begho moved back to Lagos and had a short stint with Classic FM radio. In 2010, she moved to start up a new radio station 105.1 CITY FM as a pioneer presenter alongside other presenters; she co-hosted the breakfast show and hosted the weekend show.

In January 2011, Begho moved to Rainbow FM, hosting the breakfast show and later on moved her time belt to the evening drive time show and later on the afternoon drive time belt. Still in 2011, Begho joined an internet radio called Zoodrums Radio for two months and then moved to 96.9 COOL FM Lagos, where she co-hosted the breakfast show and hosts her own show over the weekend, The Sunday Chilloutzone Show and The Twist with Shine Radio Show.

In October 2017, Shine Begho joined a new radio station 102.3 Maxfm lagos, first it was just the weekend and then, in January 2018, she became the host of the evening drive time show (Max Drive) every weekday, and in January 2019, became the new host for the Maxhits.

Accolades
 Global Media brand Ambassador for Globally Igniting Africa Organization 
 Ambassador Arkbridge Integrated (Real estate)
 Host: Kennis music Easter Fiesta
 Presenter Mystery shopper Promo
 Radio Host: The Good morning Nigeria Show, 5 am – 10, weekdays. The Sunday Chilloutzone Show Sundays 1 pm – 7 pm and The Twist With Shine Radio Show 4–5 pm Sundays on 96.9 Coolfm FM Lagos
 Radio Host: Max hits 10am – 2pm weekdays on 102.3 Max Fm Lagos 
 Radio Host: Chelsea spirit of success party radio show , syndicated radio show
 Nominee: Nigeria Merit broadcasters Awards (sexiest OAP 2012) and Female OAP of the Year 2012
 Audition Judge: Miss Tourism 2014
 Audition Judge: Mr Universe 2014
 Host : Miss Tourism 2014
 Host: Mr Universe 2014
 Radio Personality of the Year: Dynamix All Youth Awards 2012
 Radio Presenter of the year : Nira Awards 2012
 Radio Personality of the year : scream awards 2014
 Breakfast show presenter of the year : Nigeria Merit Broadcasters Awards 2014
 Star Crusader: 1 million gift of literacy 2015
 Nominee: ELOY Awards 2018 Radio host of the year

References

10 minutes with shine of cool fm – Simply Samad
 shine with stars series 2 celebrity – UberNaija 
http://ofofo.iblaze.tv/?p=3137
shine with the stars mini concert – The Net 
Slickcity Empire
Cool FM Shine Begho present Shine With – African Modelling Eyes 
Kehinde Ajose 
Shine with stars-season 2
Shine with stars-season 3 – Uber Naija
Twist with shine – Beat pluz
twist with shine – Lee Magazine
Twist with Shine – Reel radio
twist with shine – Dear artiste
twist with shyne – Olori Supergal
TTWS

External links
Weekly Entertainment News – Bella Naija
Cool FMs Shine Begho shines in Germany – Ladun Liadi
Yvonne-Vixen Toke-Makinwa Shine-Begho Tosyn-Bucknor – Millare Fashion

1985 births
Living people
Nigerian women radio presenters
Nigerian women television presenters
Madonna University alumni